Gary Phillip Reasons (born February 18, 1962) is a former American football linebacker for the New York Giants of the National Football League (NFL), winning Super Bowl XXI and Super Bowl XXV as a member of the team. Since his retirement as a player, he has served as a college football TV analyst for ESPN, ABC Sports & Fox Sports.

Biography
Reasons was also a part of two key plays during his career.
The first came during a critical late-season December 1989 game against the Denver Broncos at snowy Mile High Stadium. On fourth-and-goal from the Giants 1-yard line, John Elway handed off to Bobby Humphrey, who went airborne trying to break the plane of the goal line. But Reasons also went airborne; he collided with Humphrey in the air and stopped him, causing Humphrey to drop to the ground. The Giants, propelled by an incredible 57-yard touchdown on a screen pass to speedy David Meggett on third-and-31, went on to win that game and the NFC East that season before falling to the Los Angeles Rams in the infamous Flipper Anderson game at Giants Stadium.

The second came during the playoffs of the 1990-1991 season.  During the NFC Championship Game versus the San Francisco 49ers, Reasons ran for 30 yards on a fourth-quarter fake punt play, which helped the Giants win 15-13 and advance to the Super Bowl. Only a tackle by 49ers punt returner John Taylor prevented Reasons from scoring, but Matt Bahr did cap the drive with a field goal that brought the Giants to within 13-12.

Reasons was the first player to be named three times to the Division I-AA All-America team while playing college football at Northwestern State and in 1996 he was inducted into the College Football Hall of Fame. In 1997 Reasons was inducted into the Louisiana Sports Hall of Fame.

In 2004 and 2008, Reasons served as the head coach for the Oklahoma City Yard Dawgz arena football team.

Head coaching record

See also
History of the New York Giants (1979-1993)

References

1962 births
Living people
American football linebackers
Northwestern State Demons football players
New York Giants players
Cincinnati Bengals players
College Football Hall of Fame inductees
People from Crowley, Texas
Players of American football from Texas
Oklahoma City Yard Dawgz coaches